Grovesia is a genus of fungi in the family Helotiaceae. This is a monotypic genus, containing the single species Grovesia pulchella.

The genus name of Grovesia is in honour of James Walton Groves (1906-1970), who was a Canadian mycologist.

The genus was circumscribed by Richard William George Dennis in Kew Bull. vol.14 on page 444 in 1960.

References

External links
Grovesia at Index Fungorum

Helotiaceae
Monotypic Ascomycota genera